The Albar Albarian is an American aircraft designed for homebuilt construction.

Design and development
The Albarian is a two place, single engine, strut-braced, high wing aircraft with conventional landing gear. The fuselage is constructed of welded steel tubing with aircraft fabric covering. The wings are sourced from a Luscombe 8 with flap modifications for STOL performance.

Specifications (Albar Albarian)

See also

References

External links
 Photo of an Albarian

Homebuilt aircraft